David L. Lucchino is co-founder and CEO of Frequency Therapeutics, a biotechnology company.

Personal 

A Pittsburgh native, Lucchino graduated in 1987 from Central Catholic High School. He is the son of Judge Frank Lucchino and is the nephew of former Boston Red Sox president Larry Lucchino.

Lucchino obtained an MBA degree from MIT Sloan School of Management as an Alfred P. Sloan Fellow. Lucchino also holds a Master of Science degree from Syracuse University and a Bachelor of Arts degree from Denison University.

Career 

In 2006, while earning his MBA at MIT's Sloan School of Management, Lucchino was selected by Dr. Robert S. Langer to join a team to create implant surface technology that prevents blood clotting and infection. The team transitioned into the company Semprus BioSciences. Lucchino secured $28.5 million in venture capital financing and $5.4 million in federal funding for the company.

Lucchino is the co-founder, CEO and president of Frequency Therapeutics since November 2014, first serving as chairman, and subsequently taking on the president and CEO roles alongside co-founders biomedical engineer Jeffrey Karp and Langer.

Activities 
He was a member of the Board of Directors of the Advanced Medical Technology Association (AdvaMed), the national trade association representing the US medical device industry, from 2010 to 2013. He also serves as a director of Lipella Pharmaceuticals Inc. In 2013, Lucchino joined the board of the Multiple Myeloma Research Foundation.

He is a former member of the Board of Governors for the Sloan Fellows program.

In March 2018, Lucchino began a two-year term as chairman of the Massachusetts Biotechnology Council. Lucchino earlier was an elected member of the Board of Directors of the Massachusetts Biotechnology Council. He is a Trustee of Mt. Auburn Hospital, a 200-bed Harvard Medical School facility. He is also on the Audit Committee for CareGroup: the parent organization of Mt. Auburn, Beth Israel Deaconess Medical Center and The New England Baptist Hospital.

References 

1969 births
Living people
Central Catholic High School (Pittsburgh) alumni